The Pittsburgh Pet Expo is a consumer pet trade show that takes place annually in mid-Autumn at the David L. Lawrence Convention Center located in Downtown Pittsburgh, Pennsylvania, United States. With an estimated 14,000 spectators during the three days, the Pittsburgh Pet Expo is the second largest consumer pet trade show in the United States, covering over 2 1/2 acres of indoor space. The event originated in 2004, with an ever-widening national recognition as one of the premier pet events in the country. The event is highlighted by the annual Pet Olympics which includes the International Judges Association (IJA) sanctioned Rescue Me Rodeo Grooming Competitions, Dock Diving, National Dachshund Races, and various Agility competitions.

The event hosts roughly 250 local and national exhibitors and over 30 Animal Rescue Groups. In addition to the exhibits of pet-related products & services, the event hosts various types of entertainment and other hands-on activities. Dogs have made up the majority of pets accompanying owners, but cats, birds, lizards and other animals also participate.

References

Trade shows in the United States
Animal shows
Events in Pennsylvania